

Events 
March – Wolfgang Amadeus Mozart moves to Vienna to pursue his career. Although he is passed over in favour of Antonio Salieri as music teacher of Princess of Württemberg, he never returns permanently to Salzburg.
June 27 – Mozart writes of his new pupil and admirer, Josepha Barbara Auernhammer: "I am almost every day after dinner at H: v: Auernhammer – The freulle is a monster!".
July 29 – Mozart receives the original libretto of his next opera, Die Entführung aus dem Serail from the director of the Nationalsingspiel, Gottlieb Stephanie.
October 12 – First bagpipes competition in the Masonic Arms, Falkirk, Scotland. 
Étienne Méhul makes his first, unsuccessful attempts at orchestral composition.
Approximate date – Christian Gottlob Neefe, court organist in Bonn, takes on the young Ludwig van Beethoven as a pupil.

Classical music 
Samuel Arnold – 6 Overtures in Eight Parts, Op. 8
Carl Philipp Emanuel Bach 
6 Fugues, Wq.119/2-7
Geistliche Gesänge, Book 2  Wq. 198, H. 752
Johann Christian Bach – Sonata for Keyboard Duet, W.A 19 (Op. 18, No. 5)
William Billings – The Psalm-Singer's Amusement
Luigi Boccherini 
6 String Quartets, G.201–206 (Op. 32)
Stabat Mater, G.532
Carl Ditters von Dittersdorf – Symphonies after Ovid's Metamorphoses, Kr.73–84
Joseph Haydn 
Symphony No.75 in D major, Hob.I:75
String Quartet in C major, Hob.III:39
Horn Concerto No.2 in D major, Hob.VIId:4 (could be by Michael Haydn)
24 Lieder, Hob.XXVIa:1–24
Six String Quartets, Op. 33
Leopold Kozeluch – Sonata for Keyboard in F, "La chasse", Op. 5
Wolfgang Amadeus Mozart 
6 Variations on "Hélas, j'ai perdu mon amant", K.360/374b
Serenade in B-flat major, Gran Partita (or possibly 1782), K. 361
Misera, dove son!, K.369
Rondo in E-flat major, K.371
Serenade in E-flat major, K.375
Violin Sonata in F major, K.376/374d
Violin Sonata in F major, K.377/374e
Violin Sonata in G major, K.379/373a
Violin Sonata in E-flat major, K.380/374f
Sonata for 2 Pianos in D major, K.448/375a
Giovanni Paisiello – Concerto for Keyboard No. 1 in C major
John Parry – British harmony, being a collection of antient Welsh airs ... carefully compiled and now first published with some additional variations (Ruabon, London: John Parry & Peter Hodgson)
Antonio Rosetti – 6 Flute Concerti
Charlotte Amelie Sachsen-Gotha-Altenburg – Canzonette fürs Klavier mit Veränderungen
Samuel Wesley – Concerto for Violin No. 2 in D major
Paul Wranitzky – Sinfonie Périodique No.2 in C minor (op. 11)

Opera 
Miles Peter Andrews & Samuel Arnold – The Baron Kinkvervankotsdorsprakingatchdern
Antonio Calegari – Deucalione e Pirra
Domenico Cimarosa 
Alessandro nell'Indie
L'amante combattuto dalle donne di punto
Giannina e Bernardone
Giunio Bruto
Il pittore parigino
Elizabeth Craven et al. – The Silver Tankard
Nicolas Dalayrac – Le Chevalier à la mode
Marc-Antoine Désaugiers – Les Deux sylphes
Joseph Haydn – La fedeltà premiata
Wolfgang Amadeus Mozart – Idomeneo
Niccolò Piccinni – Iphigenie en Tauride
Antonio Salieri – Der Rauchfangkehrer
Giuseppe Sarti – Giulio Sabino
Niccolò Antonio Zingarelli – Montesuma

Methods and theory writings 

 Marmaduke Overend – A Brief Account of, and an Introduction to, 8 Lectures in the Science of Music
 Christoph Benjamin Schmidtchen – Kurzgefaßte Anfangsgründe auf das Clavier für Anfänger

Births 
January 22 – François Antoine Habeneck, violinist and conductor (died 1849)
March 11 – Anthony Philip Heinrich, composer (died 1861)
March 18 – Gustave Vogt, composer and oboist (died 1870)
May 24 – Louis-François Dauprat, French composer (died 1868)
July 20 – Sophie Lebrun, pianist and composer, daughter of Ludwig August Lebrun (died 1863)
July 27 – Mauro Giuliani, guitarist, cellist and composer (died 1829)
September 1 – Antoine Romagnesi (composer and publisher (died 1850)
September 5 – Anton Diabelli, music publisher, editor and composer (died 1858)
September 6 – Vincent Novello, organist and conductor (died 1861)
November 18 – Felice Blangini, organist and composer (died 1841)
December 1 – Charles Philippe Lafont, violinist and composer (died 1839)

Deaths 
January 22 – Johann Siebenkas, composer
February 4 – Josef Mysliveček, composer (b. 1737)
March 17 – Johannes Ewald, librettist and dramatist (born 1743)
May 22 – Garret Wesley Mornington, composer
July 11 – Adolph Carl Kunzen, composer
July 30 – Augustin Ullinger, composer
August 16 – Johanna Carolina Bach, daughter of JS Bach (born 1737)
October 9 – Thomas Erskine, 6th Earl of Kellie, musician and composer (b. 1732)
October 27 – Herman-François Delange
October – Anton Zimmermann, composer
November 4 – Faustina Bordoni, operatic mezzo-soprano (b. 1697)
date unknown – William Paxton, cellist (b. 1737)

References 
 

 
18th century in music
Music by year